Kohs may refer to:

People
Ellis B. Kohs (1916–2000), American composer
Greg Kohs (director), director of AlphaGo
Gregory Kohs, founder of MyWikiBiz
Samuel Calmin Kohs (1890–1984), American psychologist

Other
KOHS (radio station), 91.7 FM at Orem High School in Orem, Utah
Keystone Oaks High School, in suburban Pittsburgh, Pennsylvania